Jan Procházka may refer to:

 Jan Procházka (orienteer), Czech professional orienteering champion
 Jan Procházka (writer), Czech writer (1929-71)